The Oracle is an album by pianist Hank Jones, bassist Dave Holland and drummer Billy Higgins recorded in 1989 for the EmArcy label.

Receptio n

Allmusic awarded the album 4 stars, stating: "the interplay between the three musicians is quite impressive". The Penguin Guide to Jazz described it in 1992 as "a small masterpiece, certainly Jones's most inventive and adventurous album for a great many years".

Track listing
All compositions by Dave Holland except as indicated
 "Interface" (Hank Jones) - 6:43
 "Beautiful Love" (Wayne King, Victor Young, Egbert Van Alstyne, Haven Gillespie) - 6:40
 "The Oracle" - 6:45
 "Blues for C.M." - 7:15
 "Yesterdays" (Jerome Kern, Otto Harbach) - 6:20
 "Blood Count" (Billy Strayhorn) - 8:30 		
 "Maya's Dance" (Ray Drummond) - 5:48 		
 "Jacob's Ladder" - 7:30 Bonus track on CD		
 "Trane Connections" (Jimmy Heath) - 5:50

Personnel 
Hank Jones - piano
Dave Holland - bass
Billy Higgins - drums

References

External links 

1989 albums
Dave Holland albums
Hank Jones albums
Billy Higgins albums
EmArcy Records albums